Adam Monroe Byrd (July 6, 1859 – June 21, 1912) was a U.S. Representative from Mississippi.

Biography
Born in Sumter County, Alabama, Byrd moved to Neshoba County, Mississippi. He attended the common schools and Cooper Institute in Daleville, Mississippi. He graduated from the Cumberland School of Law at Cumberland University, Lebanon, Tennessee, in 1884. He was admitted to the bar in 1885 and commenced practice in Philadelphia, Mississippi. He served as superintendent of education for Neshoba County from 1887–1889. He served as a member of the State senate from 1889–1896. He served in the State house of representatives in 1896 and 1897, when he resigned. He served as prosecuting attorney for the tenth judicial district in 1897. He served as judge of the sixth chancery district from 1897 until his resignation in 1903.

Byrd was elected as a Democrat to the Fifty-eighth and to the three succeeding Congresses (March 4, 1903 – March 3, 1911). He was an unsuccessful candidate for renomination in 1910. After his time in Congress, he resumed the practice of law in Philadelphia, Mississippi. He died at Hot Springs, Arkansas on June 21, 1912. He was interred in Town Cemetery in Philadelphia, Mississippi.

References

External links

1859 births
1912 deaths
Cumberland School of Law alumni
Democratic Party Mississippi state senators
Democratic Party members of the Mississippi House of Representatives
Mississippi state court judges
Democratic Party members of the United States House of Representatives from Mississippi
People from Philadelphia, Mississippi
19th-century American politicians
19th-century American judges